The Department of War was a ministerial department of the King's household (Maison du Roi) during the Ancien Régime in France.  The department had control over the French Royal Army, Maréchaussée (military police), and the Frontier Border Troops.  In 1791, as part of the governmental reforms carried out by the Constitutional Cabinet of Louis XVI, the department was abolished and subsequently reformed as the Ministry of War.

History 

The first Secretary of State for War was appointed by Henry II of France on 1 April 1547, and till 25 May 1791 became commonplace to have a 'Secretary of State for War' leading the department.

Secretary of State for War

Organisation

List of schools 

 Staff, Administration, and Officers' Schools
 Brienne Military School – established in 1730, abolished in 1790
 École Militaire – established in 1780
 Metz Military School – established in 1720
 Combat Schools
 Saumur Cavalry School – established in 1771
 Royal School of Engineering of Mézières – established in 1748
 Artillery Schools – all based at each artillery regiment's depot: La Fère, Besançon, Grenoble, Auxonne, Metz, Perpignan, and Valence

See also 

 Ancien Régime in France
 Early Modern France

Footnotes

Notes

Citations 

1540s establishments in France
1791 disestablishments in France
Offices in the Ancien Régime